Óscar Stuardo Chinchilla Guzmán (born 21 October 1969) is a Guatemalan politician. He was  President of the Congress of Guatemala between 14 January 2017 and 14 January 2018.

Chinchilla is a member and one of the founders of Commitment, Renewal and Order. He was elected to the Congress of Guatemala in the 2011 election and the 2015 election. He serves for the District of Guatemala. In the 2012 legislative year he was third vice-president.

Chinchilla obtained a degree in engineering from the Universidad de San Carlos de Guatemala. He served on the municipal council of Villa Nueva between 2004 and 2008.

References

1969 births
Living people
Members of the Congress of Guatemala
Presidents of the Congress of Guatemala
Universidad de San Carlos de Guatemala alumni